Ecotoxicology is a peer-reviewed scientific journal covering ecotoxicology. It was established in 1992 and is published ten times per year by Springer Science+Business Media. The editor-in-chief is Lee R. Shugart. According to the Journal Citation Reports, the journal has a 2015 impact factor of 2.329.

References

External links

Toxicology journals
Springer Science+Business Media academic journals
Publications established in 1992
English-language journals
Ecology journals
10 times per year journals